Zeus Chandi de la Paz (born 11 March 1995) is a Curaçaoan professional footballer who last played as a goalkeeper for USL Championship side Oakland Roots SC.

Club career
De la Paz played in England for Nuneaton Town and in the US with fourth-tier side Cincinnati Dutch Lions, before signing for Oldham Athletic in the January 2018 transfer window.

In February 2021, USL Championship club the Oakland Roots announced they had signed de la Paz to a contract.

International career
Born in the Netherlands, de la Paz represents the Curaçao national team.

Honours
Curaçao
 King's Cup: 2019

References

External links 
 
 
 PSV profile

1995 births
Living people
Footballers from Nijmegen
Dutch people of Curaçao descent
Association football goalkeepers
Curaçao footballers
Curaçao international footballers
Dutch footballers
Jong PSV players
Nuneaton Borough F.C. players
Cincinnati Dutch Lions players
Eerste Divisie players
USL League Two players
Oldham Athletic A.F.C. players
Oakland Roots SC players
Quick 1888 players
Curaçao expatriate footballers
Curaçao expatriate sportspeople in England
Expatriate footballers in England
Curaçao expatriate sportspeople in the United States
Expatriate soccer players in the United States